The Ponsonby Rule was a constitutional convention in  United Kingdom constitutional law that dictated that most international treaties had to be laid before Parliament 21 days before ratification.

On 11 November 2010, Part 2 of the Constitutional Reform and Governance Act 2010 was brought into force by a commencement order. It provides for the ratification of (non-EU) treaties and puts parliamentary scrutiny of treaties on a statutory footing. This changed the convention into a provision having legal force.

History
From the late 19th century it became the common practice to present the treaties of the United Kingdom to Parliament after they had come into force.

On 1 April 1924, during the second reading debate on the Treaty of Peace (Turkey) Bill, Arthur Ponsonby (Parliamentary Under-Secretary of State for Foreign Affairs in Ramsay MacDonald's first Labour Government) made the following statement: 

At the same time, he stated that:

The Ponsonby Rule was withdrawn during the subsequent Baldwin Government, but was reinstated in 1929 and gradually hardened into a practice observed by all successive governments.

Other countries

The practice on legislative approval of treaties before ratification varies from country to country. In most countries, the constitution requires most treaties to be approved by the legislature before they can formally enter into force and bind the country in question. This is particularly the case in states where international treaties become part of domestic law directly, without the need for special implementation as required in the case of the United Kingdom.

In countries with a strong separation of powers, this may lead to treaties being signed by the executive, but not being ratified because of legislative opposition.

In the United States, the president must submit treaties to the Senate for its advice and consent to ratification, which requires a two-thirds vote. A famous example of a treaty not receiving consent is the Treaty of Versailles, which ended World War I, because of opposition to the League of Nations. 

In Australia, the opposite situation exists although the practical effect does not greatly differ. The executive (that is, the Australian Federal Government) may enter into a binding treaty without the involvement of Parliament. The Department of Foreign Affairs and Trade states "The power to enter into treaties is an executive power within Section 61 of the Australian Constitution and accordingly, is the formal responsibility of the Executive rather than the Parliament" and discusses the issues surrounding this fact, including the way treaties are handled in practice (which does involve Parliament). Implementation of treaties does require legislation by federal parliament, following Section 51(xxix) of the Australian Constitution. Treaties must be signed by the Governor-General of Australia.

See also
Foreign, Commonwealth and Development Office
Constitution of the United Kingdom

References

External links
Wayback Machine: FCO: the history of the Ponsonby Rule

Constitutional law
Constitution of the United Kingdom
Treaties of the United Kingdom
Foreign relations of the United Kingdom